James C. Webb is an American politician from Derry, New Hampshire, and a former member of the New Hampshire House of Representatives.

References

Republican Party members of the New Hampshire House of Representatives
People from Derry, New Hampshire
21st-century American politicians
Living people
Year of birth missing (living people)